Stefan Gölles (born 4 October 1991) is an Austrian professional footballer who plays as a right-back for SV Lafnitz.

Club career
He made his Austrian Football First League debut for TSV Hartberg on 21 July 2017 in a game against WSG Wattens.

References

External links
 

1991 births
Living people
Austrian footballers
SC Weiz players
TSV Hartberg players
Wolfsberger AC players
SV Lafnitz players
Austrian Football Bundesliga players
2. Liga (Austria) players
Association football defenders